Ebenezer Elmer (August 23, 1752 – October 18, 1843) was an American physician from Bridgeton, New Jersey. He represented New Jersey in the U.S. Congress from the Democratic-Republican Party from 1801 to 1807. Elmer's older brother, Jonathan Elmer, and Ebenezer's son Lucius Elmer were members of the United States House of Representatives.

Biography
Elmer was born in Cedarville, New Jersey, on August 23, 1752. He pursued an academic course, studied medicine and practiced in Cedarville. He served in the Continental Army as ensign, lieutenant, surgeon's mate, and regimental surgeon, and later practiced medicine in Bridgeton from 1783 to 1789. He was a member of the New Jersey General Assembly from 1789 to 1795, serving as speaker in 1791 and 1795.

Following the Revolutionary War, Elmer was admitted as an original member of The Society of the Cincinnati in the State of New Jersey, serving as the New Jersey Society's first Assistant Treasurer. He also served as the President of the New Jersey Society until his death, at which time he was the last surviving original member.

He was elected as a Democratic-Republican to the Seventh, Eighth, and Ninth Congresses, serving in office from March 4, 1801 to March 3, 1807. Not renominated by the Republicans in 1806, the Federalists put up a combined ticket with Dr. Elmer which was unsuccessful.

He was a member of the New Jersey Legislative Council in 1807, and was chosen vice president of that body. He was collector of customs of Bridgeton from 1808 until 1817, when he resigned, was reappointed in 1822 and served until 1832, when he again resigned. He served in the War of 1812, as adjutant general of the New Jersey Militia and brigadier general of the Cumberland brigade. He was vice president of Burlington College from 1808 to 1817 and 1822 to 1832. He retired from public life and died in Bridgeton on October 18, 1843. Elmer was interred in Old Broad Street Presbyterian Church Cemetery in Bridgeton.

References

External links

 Retrieved on 2010-04-27
Ebenezer Elmer at The Political Graveyard

 The Society of the Cincinnati
 American Revolution Institute

1752 births
1843 deaths
People from Lawrence Township, Cumberland County, New Jersey
People of colonial New Jersey
American people of English descent
Democratic-Republican Party members of the United States House of Representatives from New Jersey
Speakers of the New Jersey General Assembly
Members of the New Jersey Legislative Council
Members of the New Jersey General Assembly
Physicians from New Jersey
Politicians from Cumberland County, New Jersey
Continental Army officers from New Jersey
People of New Jersey in the American Revolution
American militia generals
American militiamen in the War of 1812
Burials in New Jersey